Maddie Lymburner (born ) is a Canadian fitness blogger who posts exercise videos to her YouTube channel, MadFit. As of June 2021, this channel has more than six million subscribers. In 2020, Google named her the top Canadian YouTube creator, as well as the top breakout Canadian YouTube creator.

Lymburner grew up in Waterdown, Ontario (now Hamilton, Ontario). Prior to starting the MadFit channel, Lymburner worked at a health food store and was a competitive dancer. She began taking dance lessons when she was three years old and danced competitively for seventeen years in various styles, including tap, jazz, and pointe. In 2015, she began posting videos about vegan recipes and cooking. She continued food vlogging during vacations abroad in 2016, at which point she reached 50,000 subscribers. She began the MadFit channel in 2018; during the COVID-19 pandemic, her viewership and subscribers increased, which she attributed to the closure of gyms causing more people to seek at-home workouts.

References

1990s births
Living people
Canadian YouTubers
Health and fitness YouTubers
People from Hamilton, Ontario